Sword of Honour is a 1939 British drama film directed by Maurice Elvey and starring Geoffrey Toone, Sally Gray, Dorothy Dickson. The screenplay concerns a recruit at Sandhurst who initially makes a poor impression, but goes on to prove himself by riding in the Grand National. Location shooting took place at Sandhurst, while interiors were shot at Walton Studios. Shortly afterwards, Elvey shot another military-themed film Sons of the Sea at Dartmouth Naval College.

Cast
 Geoffrey Toone as Bill Brown
 Sally Gray as Lady Moira Talmadge
 Dorothy Dickson as Mrs Stanhope
 Donald Gray as Stukely
 Wally Patch as  Pomeroy Brown
 Peter Gawthorne as Lord Carhampton
 Frederick Culley as Duke of Honiton
 Maire O'Neill as Biddy
 Gordon Begg as Grandpa Brown
 Cyril Smith as Bright
 Charles Eaton as Cameo
 Tommy Woodrooffe as Commentator
 Patrick Holt as Lord Talmadge

References

Bibliography 
  Mackenzie, S.P. British War films, 1939-1945. A&C Black, 2001.

External links

1939 films
1939 drama films
1930s English-language films
British drama films
Films set in England
Films shot in England
Films directed by Maurice Elvey
Butcher's Film Service films
Films shot at Nettlefold Studios
British black-and-white films
1930s British films